Michael Jeffry Fisher (born March 13, 1943 in Hollywood, California) is a former racecar driver from the United States.  He participated in 2 Formula One Grands Prix, debuting on August 27, 1967.  He scored no championship points.

Complete Formula One World Championship results
(key)

References
Profile at grandprix.com

1943 births
Living people
American Formula One drivers
People from Hollywood, Los Angeles
Racing drivers from Los Angeles
Racing drivers from California